Artur Vladimirovich Belotserkovets (born 29 January 1972) is a Russian former professional footballer.

Club career
He made his professional debut in the Soviet Second League in 1989 for FC Kirovets Leningrad.

References

1972 births
Footballers from Saint Petersburg
Living people
Soviet footballers
Russian footballers
Russia under-21 international footballers
Association football defenders
FC Dynamo Saint Petersburg players
FC Zenit Saint Petersburg players
FC Arsenal Tula players
FC Metallurg Lipetsk players
FC Zhenis Astana players
Russian Premier League players
Kazakhstan Premier League players
Russian expatriate footballers
Expatriate footballers in Kazakhstan
Russian expatriate sportspeople in Kazakhstan